Robert Boyle II (born May 18, 1971) is an American animator, producer, writer, storyboard artist, and director. He is the creator and executive producer of shows Wow! Wow! Wubbzy! (Nickelodeon) and Yin Yang Yo! (Jetix/Toon Disney, now Disney XD). He worked on the Nickelodeon shows Oh Yeah! Cartoons, The Fairly OddParents and Danny Phantom. He wrote and illustrated two children's books: Rosie & Rex and Hugo and the Really, Really, Really Long String.

Boyle won an Emmy Award in 2008 for his Production Design for Wow! Wow! Wubbzy!. He worked as a supervising producer on the Cartoon Network show, Clarence during its first season and co-executive producer of The Powerpuff Girls.

Filmography

Television

References

External links
 
 Bob Boyle interview on awn.com
 Boyle interview on nickjr.com
 "Nickelodeon and Disney welcome VCU alumnus" - Commonwealth Times

1971 births
American animators
American production designers
American television writers
American male television writers
American art directors
American television producers
American film directors
American animated film directors
American television directors
Prop designers
Background artists
Living people
Place of birth missing (living people)
Yin Yang Yo!
Cartoon Network Studios people
Nickelodeon Animation Studio people